International Comfort Products Corporation (ICP) is a company that designs, manufactures and markets central air conditioning (HVAC) systems and gas and oil furnaces for use in homes and commercial buildings. It is a unit of Carrier Global Corporation and is headquartered in Lewisburg, Tennessee, United States.

About
ICP is a Carrier subsidiary. ICP makes oil and gas furnaces, heat pumps, and central air-conditioning systems for residential and commercial customers.  It manufacturers, markets, and sells residential heating and cooling systems under the Arcoaire, Comfortmaker, Day & Night, Heil, KeepRite, Lincoln, and Tempstar brands; its commercial units, with up to 25 tons of cooling capacity, are sold under the ICP Commercial brand. ICP's Tempstar has international sales with support in Shanghai, China; Canoas, Brazil; Bucharest, Romania and Wiener Neudorf, Austria.

ICP produces more than a million units a year at various manufacturing complexes in the United States, Mexico and Canada. Oil furnaces are also produced at the Canadian plant in Sherbrooke, Quebec.

History
ICP has been growing through the years by developing diversified brands and acquiring competitor brands. Its goal was to establish its presence in all available market niches.

International Comfort Products Corporation brands trace their roots back many years.  Arcoaire were made by ARCO (Atlantic Richfield Company.) Both Comfortmaker and Arcoaire were parts of the SnyderGeneral Corporation (which was based in Dallas, Texas but had its residential and light commercial operations in Red Bud, Illinois and Hutchins, Texas) until in 1991 they sold their Residential Operations to Inter-City Products. Before SnyderGeneral, Comfortmaker was a brand of American Furnace Company that originated in the 1950s, which was bought out by Singer's Climate Control division, which was spun off by Richard Snyder to create SnyderGeneral. Arcoaire was a brand name of the ARCO. The KeepRite brand has been a major brand in Canada for 50 years. High efficiency oil furnaces, produced exclusively at the Quebec plant, carry the Lincoln name. Day & Night began as a solar water heater company in 1909 in Monrovia, California, providing Californians with round-the-clock hot water.  It ventured into space heating in 1930s. After extinguishing the name in 1997, the Day & Night brand name was resurrected in Western US and Canada in 2009.  Heil was established in 1962; the Tempstar brand was introduced in the 1980s in response to increased market demands for a full line of heating and cooling products.

International Comfort Products has the largest North American distribution system in the industry. Independent wholesalers sell residential and light commercial products to installers in the replacement and renovation sectors and to contractors in new construction.

ICP became a wholly owned subsidiary of United Technologies Corporation in 1999. Before this event happened, ICP was known as Inter-City Products.

In October 2002, ICP became the exclusive original equipment manufacturer (OEM) of Kenmore brand residential central heating and cooling equipment for Sears, Roebuck and Company.

Brands
 AirQuest
 Arcoaire
 Comfortmaker
 Day & Night
 Grand Aire
 Heil
 ICP Commercial
 KeepRite
 Tempstar
 Payne

References

United Technologies
1999 mergers and acquisitions
Manufacturing companies based in Tennessee
Heating, ventilation, and air conditioning companies